Jacques Leduc (born November 25, 1941) is a Canadian film director and cinematographer.

Biography
Leduc began his career in 1961 working as a film critic for the magazine Objectif. The following year, at the age of 21, he was hired as a camera assistant by the NFB. Over the course of the next few years he worked under such filmmakers as Denys Arcand, Gilles Carle, and Don Owen. In 1965 he began working as both Director and Cinematographer; his first film as director was a documentary short entitled Chantal en vrac. Leduc continued his work as Director with his first feature film in 1967 entitled Nomininque, depuis qu'il existe and his first feature documentary film in 1969 entitled Cap d'espoir. The documentary film was "about the muted violence that existed [in Quebec] and the monopoly over news held by Power Corp." and became one of the most famous cases of censorship at the NFB when it was banned by NFB commissioner Hugo McPherson.

Leduc continued working on critically acclaimed films throughout the 70s and 80s such as On est loin du soleil (1970), Tendresse ordinaire (1973), and Trois pommes à côté du sommeil (1988). In 1990 he left the NFB and became a freelance filmmaker.  In 1992 he directed the film La vie fantôme; the film was named Best Canadian Film at the Montreal World Film Festival and earned a Genie Award for Best Screenplay nomination. Since then he has primarily worked with other Directors as their cinematographer and in 2008 was awarded the Prix Albert-Tessier.

Selected filmography

Features
We Are Far from the Sun (On est loin du soleil) - 1971
Ordinary Tenderness (Tendresse ordinaire) - 1973
The Last Glacier (Le dernier glacier) - 1984, co-directed with Roger Frappier
Lessons on Life (Trois pommes à côté du sommeil) - 1989
Phantom Life (La Vie fantôme) - 1992
When I Will Be Gone (L'Âge de braise) - 1998

Other work
Chantal en vrac - documentary short, 1966
Nominingue... depuis qu'il existe - TV movie, 1967
Cap d'espoir - documentary short, 1969
Là ou ailleurs - documentary short co-directed with Pierre Bernier, 1969
Ça marche - documentary short co-directed with Arnie Gelbart, 1969
Je chante à cheval avec Willie Lamothe - documentary short co-directed with Lucien Ménard, 1971
Alegria - documentary short, 1973
Chronique de la vie quotidienne - 1977–1978, an anthology series of 8 films
Albédo - documentary short co-directed with René Roy, 1982
Les Attentes - TV movie, 1986
Les Inquietudes de Diane - TV movie, 1986
Notes sur l'arrière-saison - documentary short, 1986
Le Temps des cigales - documentary short, 1987
Charade chinoise - documentary, 1987
Montreal Stories (Montréal vu par...) - segment "La Toile du temps" - 1991
A Child on the Lake (L'Enfant sur le lac) - TV movie, 1992

References

External links

1941 births
Living people
Artists from Montreal
Film directors from Montreal
Writers from Montreal
Canadian cinematographers
Canadian screenwriters in French
French Quebecers
National Film Board of Canada people
Canadian television directors
Prix Albert-Tessier winners